Marcus Beresford (14 February 1764 – 16 November 1797) was an Irish politician.

Background
A member of the Beresford family headed by the Marquess of Waterford, he was the eldest son of John Beresford. George Beresford and John Claudius Beresford were his younger brothers. He was educated at Trinity College, Dublin.

Political career
Beresford was returned to the Irish House of Commons for Dungarvan in 1783, a seat he held until his death fourteen years later.

Family
Beresford married Frances Arabella, daughter of Joseph Leeson, 1st Earl of Milltown, in 1791. They had three children:
Lt John Theophilus Beresford (1792 – 19 January 1812), mortally wounded by the explosion of a magazine at the Siege of Ciudad Rodrigo
Elizabeth Beresford (1794-7 December 1856), married Felix Calvert Ladbroke (1802-1869) the son of Felix Ladbroke and Mary Ann Shubrick.
William Beresford (1797–1883) was a Conservative politician and government minister.

He died in November 1797, aged 33. His wife survived him by over 40 years and died in May 1840.

References

1764 births
1797 deaths
Marcus
Irish MPs 1783–1790
Irish MPs 1790–1797
Members of the Parliament of Ireland (pre-1801) for County Waterford constituencies
Alumni of Trinity College Dublin